MIIS is an acronym that could refer to a number of things.

Middlebury Institute of International Studies at Monterey, a graduate school in California
MIIS (programming language), a computer programming language
Microsoft Identity Integration Server, Microsoft server software for identity and access management solutions
Mii, a simulated avatar created on the Wii, DS, Wii U, 3DS, and Switch consoles
Multiple Intelligence International School, an international school in Metro Manila, Philippines

See also

 
 MII (disambiguation)
 mi2 (disambiguation)